Béla Szőkefalvi-Nagy  (29 July 1913, Kolozsvár – 21 December 1998, Szeged) was a Hungarian mathematician. His father, Gyula Szőkefalvi-Nagy was also a famed mathematician. Szőkefalvi-Nagy collaborated with Alfréd Haar and Frigyes Riesz, founders of the Szegedian school of mathematics. He contributed to the theory of Fourier series and approximation theory. His most important achievements were made in functional analysis, especially, in the theory of Hilbert space operators. He was editor-in-chief of the Zentralblatt für Mathematik, the Acta Scientiarum Mathematicarum,  and the Analysis Mathematica. He was awarded the Kossuth Prize in 1953, along with his co-author F. Riesz, for his book Leçons d'analyse fonctionnelle.  He was awarded the Lomonosov Medal in 1979. The Béla Szőkefalvi-Nagy Medal honoring his memory is awarded yearly by Bolyai Institute.

His books 
 Béla Szőkefalvi-Nagy: Spektraldarstellung linearer Transformationen des Hilbertschen Raumes.(German) Berlin, 1942. 80 p.; 1967. 82 p.
 Frederic Riesz, Béla Szőkefalvi-Nagy: Leçons d'analyse fonctionnelle. (French) 2e éd. Akadémiai Kiado, Budapest, 1953, VIII+455 pp.
  
 Ciprian Foiaş, Béla Szőkefalvi-Nagy: Analyse harmonique des opérateurs de l'espace de Hilbert. (French) Masson et Cie, Paris; Akadémiai Kiadó, Budapest 1967 xi+373 pp.
 Béla Szőkefalvi-Nagy, Frederic Riesz: Funkcionálanalízis. Budapest, 1988. 534 p. (English: Functional Analysis (1990). Dover. )

His articles 
 Diagonalization of matrices over H∞. Acta Scientiarum Mathematicarum. Szeged, 1976
 On contractions similar to isometries and Toeplitz operators, with Ciprian Foiaş. Ann. Acad. Scient. Fennicae, 1976.
 The function model of a contraction and the space L’/H’, with Ciprian Foiaş. Acta Scientiarum Mathematicarum. Szeged, 1979, 1980.
 Toeplitz type operators and hyponormality, with Ciprian Foiaş. Operator theory. Advances and appl., 1983.
 Factoring compact operator-valued functions, with authors. Acta Scientiarum Mathematicarum. Szeged, 1985.
Sz.-Nagy, Béla (1954), "Ein Satz über Parallelverschiebungen konvexer Körper", Acta Universitatis Szegediensis, 15: 169–177, MR 0065942, archived from the original on 2016-03-04, retrieved 2013-05-19.

Award in his honour 

In 1999, Béla Szőkefalvi-Nagy's daughter Erzsébet, established the Béla Szőkefalvi-Nagy Medal to remember her father. This medal is meant to recognize distinguished mathematicians who have published significant work in Acta Scientiarum Mathematicarum. The following mathematicians have been awarded the medal:

C. Foiaş (2000)
K. Tandori (2001)
L. Leindler (2002)
G. Grätzer (2003)
F. Móricz (2004)
T. Ando (2005)
B. Csákány (2006)

H. Bercovici (2007)
E.T. Schmidt (2008)
H. Langer (2009)
P.A. Grillet (2010)
L. Zsidó (2011)
L. Kérchy (2012)
V. Müller (2013)

Z. Sebestyén (2014)
Pei Yuan Wu (2015)
G. Czédli (2016)
L. Lovász (2017)
P. Šemrl (2018)
L. Hatvani (2019)
F. H. Szafraniec (2020)
L. Stachó (2021)
Zs. Páles (2022)

See also 
 Sz.-Nagy's dilation theorem
 Erdős-Nagy theorem

To the memory of Béla Szőkefalvi-Nagy 
 Operator theory: advances and applications. Recent advances in operator theory and related topics : the Béla Szökefalvi-Nagy memorial volume : [memorial conference held August 2–6, 1999 in Szeged] / eds. László Kérchy et al. Basel ; Boston ; Berlin : Birkhäuser Verlag, 2001. XLIX, 670 p. (Operator theory : advances and applications ; 127.)

References 

 D.P. Zhelobenko, Bela Szokefalvi-Nagy (obituary), Russian Mathematical Surveys 54 (1999), 819-822.
 Szôkefalvi-Nagy Béla (in Hungarian)

Members of the Hungarian Academy of Sciences
Mathematical analysts
20th-century Hungarian mathematicians
1913 births
1998 deaths
Academic staff of Franz Joseph University
Austro-Hungarian mathematicians